Dichocrocis frenatalis is a moth in the family Crambidae. It was described by Julius Lederer in 1863. It is found in India, where it has been recorded from the Nicobar Islands.

References

Moths described in 1863
Spilomelinae